Pedro Senatore Ramos (born 2 May 1968 in Guayaquil) is an Ecuadorian association football referee, best known for having supervised one match during the 2004 Copa América in Peru. He also refereed at the Copa Libertadores 2006.

References
Profile
worldfootball

1968 births
Living people
Ecuadorian football referees
Copa América referees
Sportspeople from Guayaquil
21st-century Ecuadorian people